The 1934 North Texas State Teachers Eagles football team represented North Texas State Teachers College–now known as the University of North Texas—as a member of the Lone Star Conference (LSC) during the 1934 college football season. Led by sixth-year head coach Jack Sisco, the Eagles compiled an overall record of 5–4 with a mark of 2–2 in conference play, tying for second place in the LSC.

Schedule

References

North Texas State Teachers
North Texas Mean Green football seasons
North Texas State Teachers Eagles football